Fernando Enrique may refer to:

 Fernando Enrique (canoeist) (born 1998), Cuban sprint canoeist
 Fernando Enrique (footballer) (born 1985), Argentine midfielder